Serenay is a Turkish feminine name. Notable people with the name include:

Serenay Aktaş (born 1993), Turkish former women's footballer, and television and film actress
Serenay Öziri (born 1994), Turkish women's footballer
Serenay Sarıkaya (born 1992), Turkish actress and model

See also
 Serena (disambiguation)